WFJ may refer to:

Washington for Jesus, a series of demonstrations held in Washington, D.C.
Watford Junction railway station, Hertfordshire, National Rail station code
Willard F. Jones (1890–1967), American naval architect, business executive and philanthropist